Events in the year 1658 in Norway.

Incumbents
Monarch: Frederick III

Events
8 March - The Treaty of Roskilde resulted in the ceding of the Norwegian provinces of Båhuslen and Trondhjems len to Sweden. (At the Treaty of Copenhagen (1660) Trondhjems len was returned to Norway).
5 August - The Bjelke Feud starts.
14 September - The First Battle of Frederikshald.
4 October - The siege of Trondheim starts.
11 December - The siege of Trondheim ends.

Arts and literature

The pulpit in the Stavanger Cathedral is carved by Andrew Lawrenceson Smith.

Births

Deaths

See also

References